Virginia Huston (April 24, 1925 – February 28, 1981) was an American actress.

Early years
Huston was born in Wisner, Nebraska, the daughter of Marcus and Mary Agnes Houston, and she had two brothers. Once she began her acting career, she changed the spelling of her last name to match that of Walter and John Huston. She attended Duchesne Catholic School for Girls in Omaha and appeared in stage productions as a student there.

When Huston was 12, she first appeared on radio in an episode of Calling All Cars. Huston gained early experience on stage by appearing in plays presented by the Omaha Community Playhouse.

Film
Huston's first film was Desirable Woman. She appeared in many 1940s and 1950s film noir and adventure films.  Signing with RKO in 1945, her first film was opposite George Raft in Nocturne (1946). Her singing voice in the nightclub was redubbed by a singer. Huston was the ninth actress to play Jane, appearing in Tarzan's Peril (1951). (Another source says, "She becomes the fifteenth 'Jane' in this jungle-king series.")

Her other films include the film noir Out of the Past (released in the UK as Build My Gallows High) (1947), in which she plays Robert Mitchum's girlfriend. She appeared in  The Racket (1951), which also starred Mitchum, and in the Joan Crawford dramas Flamingo Road (1949) and Sudden Fear (1952).

Huston suffered a broken back in an automobile accident, which disrupted her career at its peak. When she returned, she dropped to minor roles and "B"-level films.

Personal life and death
Huston retired from films after marrying Manus Paul Clinton II, a real estate agent, in 1952. She died of cancer in 1981.

Filmography

References

External links 
 

1925 births
1981 deaths
American film actresses
American stage actresses
American radio actresses
American television actresses
People from Wisner, Nebraska
Actresses from Nebraska
20th-century American actresses